Hriday Nath Wanchoo was a Kashmiri communist trade-unionist, who is remembered for ensuring the socioeconomic upliftment of sanitation workers and documenting abuse of human rights in Kashmir.

Career and politics 
Wanchoo was employed as the Khilafarzi officer in Srinagar municipality. Wanchoo documented extrajudicial murders, rapes, and illegal detentions by millitant forces often filing petitions for legal recourse. He was a pioneer that fought for Kashmiri muslims

Death 
Wanchoo was assassinated by "unidentified gunmen" on 5 December 1992.These unidentified men came asking him to help them out in some legal case for child of a sweeper. He went with them and was assasinated at Balgarden, karan nagar by the same gunmen. Local activists accused the government of having released two militants in exchange for an extra-judicial execution, one of whom was later killed in an "encounter"; Human Rights Watch noted Wanchoo's murder to fit into the state's brutal suppression of conversations on human rights. Days before his death, Wanchoo had confessed in private, about threats to his life from militant groups. 

However, the Central Bureau of Investigation, upon probing the murder, laid the blame on a militant group called "Jamait-ul-Mujahidin". Three of its members — Mohammad Shafi Khan (aka Shafi Shariati), a faculty member of the University of Kashmir specialising in Persian; Ashiq Hussain Faktoo, a budding separatist; Ghulam Qadir Bhat — went to trial, all of whom had confessed to their crimes. Whereas the trial court acquitted all of them citing procedural deficiencies in obtaining confessional statements and the absence of any other corroborative evidence, the Supreme Court of India overturned the judgement and sentenced all of them to life imprisonment.

The judgement remains disputed; Scholars Seema Kaji and Sumantra Bose suspect the Indian state to have had a role in the murder.

References 

Year of birth missing
Place of birth missing
1992 deaths
Assassinated Indian people
Jammu Kashmir Liberation Front
Activists from Jammu and Kashmir
Indian trade unionists
Indian communists